The Edward Hill Brewer House (also known as The Palms) is a historic home in Winter Park, Florida. It is located at 240 Trismen Terrace and was added to the National Register of Historic Places on April 22, 1982.

History 
In 1895, the Brewer family first visited Winter Park, searching for a warmer climate to escape New York's winters. In 1898, Edward Brewer, an industrialist, bought forty acres of land to construct a house. Construction began in 1899. He named the house "The Palms" and frequently entertained the community there. In 1923, Brewer renovated the house to more closely his resemble his Colonial Revival mansion in New York. In 1938, the Brewer family sold the home.

References

External links
 Photographs from the Rollins College Archives

Gallery

Houses on the National Register of Historic Places in Florida
National Register of Historic Places in Orange County, Florida
Buildings and structures in Winter Park, Florida
Houses in Orange County, Florida
Colonial Revival architecture in Florida
Houses completed in 1899